Children's Cinema is a Canadian children's film television series which aired on CBC Television from 1969 to 1975.

Premise
Bob Homme (The Friendly Giant) hosted this series of films for children from Canada and other nations.

Scheduling
The initial series was run weekdays at 10:00 a.m. (North American Eastern time) for half-hour time slots during the Christmas holidays from 22 December 1969 to 2 January 1970. Regular season runs began October 1970 and were broadcast Saturdays at 1:00 p.m. (Eastern time) as follows:

References

External links
 

CBC Television original programming
1969 Canadian television series debuts
1975 Canadian television series endings